Taking the Lead is the first solo album by Sonata Arctica guitarist Elias Viljanen. It was released in 2002 by Lion Music.

Track listing

Credits
 Elias Viljanen - Guitars
 Rami Herckman  - Bass guitar
 Tomi Ylönen - Drums
 Tero Ylönen - Keyboards (on track 1,2,3,5,8)
 Jani Kemppinen - Keyboards (on track 6,9,11,12)

2002 debut albums